Jameson's firefinch (Lagonosticta rhodopareia) is a common species of estrildid finch found in Sub-Saharan Africa. It has an estimated global extent of occurrence of 2,600,000 km2.

It is found in Angola, Botswana, Chad, The Democratic Republic of the Congo, Eritrea, Ethiopia, Kenya, Malawi, Mali, Mozambique, Namibia, South Africa, South Sudan, Eswatini, Tanzania, Uganda, Zambia and Zimbabwe. The IUCN has classified the species as being of least concern.

References

External links
BirdLife International species factsheet
Species text in The Atlas of Southern African Birds

Jameson's firefinch
Birds of Sub-Saharan Africa
Jameson's firefinch
Taxa named by Theodor von Heuglin